Ethmia cyanea is a moth in the family Depressariidae. It is found in northern Veracruz in Mexico.

The ground color of the forewings is unicolorous, dark, shining greenish blue. The ground color of the hindwings (including fringe) is dark purple. Adults have been recorded in April and June.

References

Moths described in 1912
cyanea